Avaaz is a U.S.-based nonprofit organization launched in January 2007 that promotes global activism on issues such as climate change, human rights, animal rights, corruption, poverty, and conflict. In 2012, The Guardian referred to Avaaz as "the globe's largest and most powerful online activist network".

The name chosen for the community is a Romanization of a word meaning "voice" in Persian and various languages, such as
Hindi आवाज़ and Urdu آواز.

Cofounders

Groups
Avaaz.org was co-founded by Res Publica, a "community of public sector professionals dedicated to promoting good governance, civic virtue and deliberative democracy", and MoveOn.org, an American non-profit progressive public policy advocacy group. It was also supported by Service Employees International Union, a founding partner.

Individuals
Avaaz's individual co-founders include Ricken Patel, Tom Pravda, former Virginia congressman Tom Perriello, MoveOn Executive Director Eli Pariser, Australian entrepreneur David Madden, Jeremy Heimans (co-founders of Purpose.com), and Andrea Woodhouse.

Leadership
Avaaz's founding President and former CEO is the Canadian-British Ricken Patel. He studied PPE (politics, philosophy, economics) at Balliol College, Oxford University. He received a Master's degree in Public Policy from Harvard University. He worked for the International Crisis Group around the world, including in Sierra Leone, Liberia, Sudan and Afghanistan, where he says "he learnt how to bring rebel forces to the negotiation table, to monitor elections (covertly), to restore public faith in once corrupt political systems and to spot when foreign forces were being manipulated". He returned to the USA and volunteered for MoveOn.org, where he learned how to use online tools for activism.

Funding, campaigns selection process and management
"Since 2009, Avaaz has not taken donations from foundations or corporations, nor has it accepted payments of more than $5,000 (£3,100)", The Guardian reported. "Instead, it relies simply on the generosity of individual members, who have now raised over $20m (£12.4m)." Prior to 2009, various foundations had funded Avaaz's staff and start-up costs.

Global campaigns selection process
Avaaz global campaigns are managed by a team of campaigners working from over 30 countries, including the UK, India, Lebanon and Brazil. They communicate with members via email, and employ campaigning tactics including online public petitions, videos, and email-your-leader tools. In some cases Avaaz also uses advertisements and commissions legal advice to clarify how best to take a campaign forward, and stages "sit-ins, rallies, phone-ins and media friendly stunts". Examples of stunts include "taking a herd of cardboard pigs to the doors of the World Health Organization to demand an investigation into the link between swine flu and giant pig farms and creating a three-mile human chain handshake from the Dalai Lama to the doors of the Chinese Embassy in London to request dialogue between the parties".

Suggestions for campaigns come from members, supplemented by guidance from teams of specialists. Once a suggestion has been taken up as having potential, tester emails are polled to 10,000 Avaaz members; if the emails receive a sufficient response, the campaign is opened up to all Avaaz members. In 2010, The Economist suggested that "the way Avaaz bunches unlikely causes together may be an asset in a world where campaigns, like race and class, can still segregate people, not reconcile them".

Ideology
Avaaz claims to unite practical idealists from around the world. Former director Ricken Patel said in 2011: "We have no ideology per se. Our mission is to close the gap between the world we have and the world most people everywhere want. Idealists of the world unite!"
In practice, Avaaz often supports causes considered progressive, such as calling for global action on climate change, challenging Monsanto, and building greater global support for refugees.

During the 2009 Iranian presidential election protests, Avaaz set up Internet proxy servers to allow protesters to upload videos onto public websites.

Avaaz supported the establishment of a no-fly zone over Libya, which led to the military intervention in the country in 2011. It was criticized for its pro-intervention stance in the media and blogs.

Avaaz supported the civil uprising preceding the Syrian Civil War. This included sending $1.5 million of Internet communications equipment to protesters, and training activists. Later it used smuggling routes to send over $2 million of medical equipment into rebel-held areas of Syria.  It also smuggled 34 international journalists into Syria. Avaaz coordinated the evacuation of wounded British photographer Paul Conroy from Homs. Thirteen Syrian activists died during the evacuation operation. Some senior members of other non-governmental organizations working in the Middle East have criticized Avaaz for taking sides in a civil war. As of November 2016, Avaaz continues campaigning for no-fly zones over Syria in general and specifically Aleppo.  (Gen. Dunford, Chairman of the Joint Chiefs of Staff of the United States, has said that establishing a no-fly zone means going to war against Syria and Russia.)  It has received criticism from parts of the political blogosphere and has a single digit percentage of its users opposing the petitions, with a number of users ultimately leaving the network. The Avaaz team responded to this criticism by issuing two statements defending their decision to campaign.

In the 2016 United States presidential election, Avaaz campaigned against Donald Trump with the slogan "Defeat Donald Trump", and produced a software tool to simplify overseas voter registration.

Avaaz opposed 21st Century Fox's bid to take over the pan-European broadcasting company Sky plc. As part of this campaign, Avaaz brought Wendy Walsh, a woman who alleges she was sexually harassed at Fox News, to London in May 2017 to testify to British media regulator Ofcom. In September 2017, Avaaz took legal action in the British High Court of Justice, by seeking a judicial review of the regulator Ofcom's decision not to recommend rejection of the takeover. Bloomberg described Avaaz as "the fly in the ointment of Murdoch's Sky bid". When Mr Murdoch withdrew his Sky bid, Ian Burrell commented that it "represents a victory for the civic activist group Avaaz, which has relentlessly campaigned against a takeover which seemed inevitable".

Monsanto subpoena
In January 2018, Monsanto requested Avaaz hand over all documents the organization held in relation to glyphosate. Lawyers for the company said they planned to use the documentation in their defense during an upcoming court case involving two plaintiffs in Missouri who say their cancer was caused by exposure to Monsanto's "Roundup" herbicide. Avaaz argued that a successful subpoena would result in a "chilling effect" on the group's work.

On September 5, 2018, a New York judge sided with Avaaz. The judge stated that the subpoena "risked 'chilling' free speech and political activity", and argued that Monsanto's request was "anti-democratic".

Reception 
Some question whether Avaaz's focus on online petitions and email campaigns may encourage laziness, transforming potential activism into clicktivism. Malcolm Gladwell says that petition tools do not create "close-knit, disciplined and tenacious" networks of activists. In February 2012, Avaaz raised money for the evacuation of Paul Conroy from Syria, a mission that led to the deaths of 13 activists in Syria. A New Republic article accused Avaaz of making false claims about their own role in the evacuation. Jillian York has accused Avaaz of arrogance and lack of transparency. The Defensor Da Natureza blog has accused Avaaz of taking credit for the success of the Ficha Limpa anti-corruption bill in Brazil, which Luis Nassif reposted.

In 2008, Canadian conservative minister John Baird labeled Avaaz a "shadowy foreign organization" tied to billionaire George Soros.

Another Canadian, conservative media personality Ezra Levant, tried to make a link between Soros and Avaaz.org as an indirect supporter through MoveOn, but the article was later retracted as baseless and an apology was offered to Soros.

See also
 Internet activism
 Slacktivism

References

External links
AVAAZ home page

Organizations established in 2007
Internet-based activism
Human rights organizations
International political websites
American political websites
Left-wing advocacy groups
Left-wing activism
Online petitions
International organizations based in the United States